Karl Alpiger (born 27 April 1961) is a former Swiss alpine skier.

Career
During his career he has achieved 11 results among the top 10 (5 victories) in the World Cup.

Life after competitive skiing
At the end of his career, which occurred at the age of 30 in 1991, he briefly commented on ski races for Eurosport, but today he runs a ski shop in his Wildhaus and an "apres ski" bar.

World Cup victories

Europa Cup results
Alpiger has won two discipline cups of the Europa Cup.

FIS Alpine Ski Europa Cup
Downhill: 1982, 1985

References

External links
 
 
 

Swiss male alpine skiers
1961 births
Living people
20th-century Swiss people